André Edmond Alfred Cluysenaar (31 May 1872, Saint-Gilles - 17 April 1939, Uccle) was a Belgian painter. He was especially known for portraits and female figures.

Life and work 

He was member of the Cluysenaar family, descendant from a long line of architects who originated in Aachen, where the family name was spelled "Klausener". Perhaps the best-known among these was his grandfather Jean-Pierre Cluysenaar. His wife, Alice Gordon, was related to Lord Byron.

He received his first art lessons from his father, then studied with François-Joseph Navez. Initially, he worked as a sculptor, but devoted himself entirely to painting after 1902. He was firmly grounded in the romantic style at first; producing still lifes and genre scenes, but later turned to impressionism and painted mostly female figures, often semi-nude. He also executed monumental ceiling paintings for the City Hall in Saint-Gilles.

During World War I, he lived in London where he established a reputation painting portraits of notable people, including the Royal Family, which were done in a more commercial style using  Alfred Stevens as a model. Most of these portraits may be seen in the National Gallery.

Honours 
 1919 : Knight of the Order of Leopold.
 1934 : Officer in the Order of the Crown.

References

Further reading 

 Fanny Cluysenaar,: Les Cluysenaar, une famille d'artistes. Brussels, Weissenbruch, 1928
 Madelaine Delacre and Marjorie Pym: André Cluysenaar, portraitiste, Verlag Phototypie Thill, 1937

External links 

1872 births
1939 deaths
Klausener Family
People from Saint-Gilles, Belgium
Portrait painters
20th-century Belgian painters